The Union des Français de l'Etranger (French Foreign Union), or UFE, is a French organization with branches in more than 100 countries around the world in major world cities including New York City, Los Angeles, Chicago and Washington, D.C. where there is a significant French or Francophone population. It was founded in 1927 and is the oldest association representing French expatriates and is recognised as a public utility.

Canadian branch
One of the biggest branches of Union des Français de l'étranger was founded in Canada in 1983 by Jean-Luc Malherbe and Josette Villavaryan-Bardon. It aims to defend the interests of French citizens who live in the region of the national capital of Canada, the Ontario agglomeration of Ottawa and the Gatineau side of Quebec.

It is difficult to estimate accurately the number of French citizens living in the region, but based on the lists of registrations at the French consulate in Toronto, it is estimated that about 5,000 live in the region. The French embassy in Ottawa continues to provide essential services to the residents of the region since its consular services were closed on 1 July 2005.

The association groups the French community and organises friendly meals and méchoui (North African style barbecue of spit-roast whole lamb over a charcoal pit), wine and cheese parties, and opportunities to meet French political personalities passing through the region. It maintains links with French organisations in Canada (embassies, consulates) and in France. It collaborates with Jacques Janson, the representative of the Centre and the West of Canada, to convey and resolve files which have been submitted to them by French citizens in the region.

The presidency has been held since 1997 by Christian Lohyer.

External links
 Official website
 UFE Berlin
 UFE Seattle
 UFE Monaco (Union des Français de Monaco)

Political parties in France
Political parties established in 1927
Overseas French organisations